Plugged is a 2011 crime novel by Eoin Colfer.

The cover was first shown in an interview with Artemis Fowl Confidential.  It was published in a slightly revised format.

References

2011 Irish novels
Irish crime novels
Headline Publishing Group books
The Overlook Press books